The 2017 Rugby League World Cup Europe qualification was a rugby league tournament held in October and November 2016 to decide the three European qualifiers for the 2017 Rugby League World Cup.

It consisted of a round-robin tournament which saw Wales and Ireland qualify by winning their respective tables. Italy claimed the final qualifying spot in the World Cup after winning a second place play-off against Russia on 4 November 2016.

Overview 
On 3 October 2014, the 2017 Rugby League World Cup qualifying competition was announced. Three European teams were granted automatic qualification, as they had reached the quarter-finals of the 2013 Rugby League World Cup; England, France and Scotland.

Ten teams were able to qualify for the qualification tournament, with the first being eliminated when Spain defeated Latvia on 9 May 2015.

Wales and Ireland were granted entry to the qualification tournament. Both teams already had a chance to qualify for the World Cup during the 2014 European Cup, but failed to do so. One of the other tournament places was allocated to the winner of the European Championship C tournament, and the other three were allocated to the top three teams from the European Championship B.

Italy, Russia and Serbia finished as the top three teams in the European Championship B, with Ukraine being eliminated.

Spain finished as the top team in the European Championship C, with Greece and Malta eliminated.

Teams 
Qualified teams for final phase:
  were granted automatic entry as 1st seed
  were granted automatic entry as 2nd seed
  qualified as 3rd seed after finishing top of the Rugby League European Championship B.
  qualified as 4th seed after finishing 2nd in the Rugby League European Championship B.
  qualified as 5th seed after finishing 3rd in the Rugby League European Championship B.
  qualified as 6th seed after finishing top of the Rugby League European Championship C.

Squads

Ireland
The final Ireland 22-man squad as of 9 October 2016 is as follows:

Coach:  Mark Aston

Italy
The final Italy 22-man squad as of 8 October 2016 is as follows:

Coach:  Cameron Ciraldo

 * Denotes a rugby union club.

Russia
The final Russia 22-man squad as of 6 September 2016 is as follows:

Coach:  Denis Korolev

 * Denotes a rugby union club.

Serbia
The final 22-man squad as of 5 October 2016 is as follows:

Coach:  Ljubomir Bukvic

Spain
The final 22-man squad as of 4 October 2016 is as follows:

Coach:  Darren Fisher

 * Denotes a rugby union club.

Wales
The final Wales 22-man squad as of 7 October 2016 is as follows:

On October 14, Dai Evans was brought into the squad to replace Calvin Wellington who withdrew due to a hamstring injury.

On October 21, 19-year old Ben Morris was called up to the squad to play in a mid-qualifying campaign test match against Jamaica.

On October 29, Danny Ansell was called up to the squad with a possibility of playing in the last qualifying game against Italy.

*Sam Hopkins was called into the team for the final qualifier against Italy after Jacob Emmitt withdrew due to a hamstring injury.

Coach:  John Kear

Final Tables

Group A

Group B

Fixtures

Russia vs Spain

Wales vs Serbia

Serbia vs Italy

Spain vs Ireland

Italy vs Wales

Ireland vs Russia

Second place play-off

The final qualifying place was determined by a single knockout match held between the two group runners-up on 4 November 2016.

References 

World Cup qualification - Europe
Qualification,Europe
2016 in Irish sport
2016 in Italian sport
2016 in Russian sport
2016 in Serbian sport
2016 in Spanish sport
World Cup qualification